Swangrove is a Grade I listed country house in Hawkesbury, South Gloucestershire, England. The listing includes Swangrove House, its garden walls, four corner pavilions, and gate piers. It was built in 1703 by William Killigrew of Bath.

References

External links

Country houses in Gloucestershire
Grade I listed houses in Gloucestershire
Houses completed in 1703
1703 establishments in England